Mustang Creek may refer to the following creeks:

Mustang Creek (California)
Mustang Creek (Johnson County), Texas
Mustang Creek, (Somervell County), Texas
Mustang Creek  (Tarrant County), Texas

See also 
 Mustang (disambiguation)